Casa de Cadillac is a Cadillac-Buick-GMC dealership located at 14401 Ventura Boulevard, in Sherman Oaks, CA. Due to its classic Googie architecture and tenure in the area, the dealership building, built in 1949, has become an architectural landmark in the San Fernando Valley.

History
Casa de Cadillac opened in 1950 at 14401 Ventura Boulevard and has operated continuously in the same facility since that time. The dealership originally opened in 1949 as Don Lee Motors which was part of the Don Lee organization that operated Cadillac dealerships throughout the state of California, including major cities such as Fresno, Sacramento, Oakland, San Francisco, Pasadena, and Los Angeles.

Ownership of the dealership passed from Lee to Martin Pollard in 1950 who changed the name to Casa de Cadillac. Pollard was influential in local business and an active member of the San Fernando Valley community. He served at various times as the President of Valley Presbyterian Hospital, President of the Sherman Oaks Chamber of Commerce, and was the first chairman of the Los Angeles Metropolitan Transit Authority. In 1959, Pollard was the first ever recipient of the "Fernando Award" given by the Fernando Award Foundation in recognition of outstanding community volunteerism in the San Fernando Valley. Upon Pollard's death in 1970, the Sherman Oaks branch of the Los Angeles Public Library was named in his honor.

After Pollard's death, James Wilson became president of Casa de Cadillac and was active in its daily operations through 2008. During that time, Casa Automotive Group (the parent company of Casa de Cadillac) acquired several additional franchises including Buick, GMC, Hummer, Saab, Kia, and Subaru.  In 2008, Wilson passed ownership to his daughter and son-in-law, Susan and Howard Drake.  Today, Cadillac, Buick and GMC are sold at the Sherman Oaks location while Subaru is sold at a separate dealership in nearby Van Nuys.

Architecture
Designed by Randall Duell in 1948, Casa de Cadillac is now considered a prime example of Googie architecture.  It has been included in modern architectural walking tours organized by the Modern Committee of the Los Angeles Conservancy and Los Angeles Times and has become a popular location for photography and filming.

Popular culture
- During the 1970s and 1980s, television game shows like Let's Make a Deal and Sale of the Century gave away many new Cadillac automobiles announcing, during the description of the prize, that the car was from Casa de Cadillac.

- In the season three finale of Universal Pictures's popular and enduring "Columbo" detective movie series, Casa de Cadillac is lavishly featured beginning at time 1:05 in the film when Lieutenant Columbo has to visit to interview one of the firm's salesmen, a perfectly coiffed Mr. Shoup, complete with camel's hair suit and Rolex President, (presumably gifts from the deceased girl in the movie), whose alibi is that he was swinging with one of the "little book-keepers" at the dealership when his regular date stood him up (presumably on account of her being murdered by the real bad guy in the film, the chief of police).  The Casa de Cadillac agency is particularly noteworthy in this scene because it shows a complete front row of multi-hued 1973 Deville and Fleetwood models, and behind that a complete row of brand new 1974 models including 2 Eldorados.  The rain droplets on the lacquer of the new cars contrasts beautifully with the primer of Columbo's 20 year old junk Peugeot 403, for which Mr. Shoup generously offers the lieutenant $80.00 in a trade.  Also noteworthy were the large gold Cadillac insignias on the signs for the agency, which were obviously erected in 1952–1953, because the insignia changed shape every year during that decade and were only done in gold for the 1952 year, the 50th anniversary of the Cadillac division.  Each sign was larger than a Cadillac.

- In Michael Bay's Transformers, the character Jazz drops down from the roof of the Casa De Cadillac dealership before transforming into vehicle form to meet with the other Autobots at Bumblebee's location.

- In the 1985 Arnold Schwarzenegger action film Commando, the character Cooke commandeers a Cadillac and drives it through the display window.

- In Tom Petty's "Free Fallin" (1989), Casa de Cadillac stands prominently across the street from the pink Future Dogs hot dog stand.

- In NBC's Up All Night, Christina Applegate and Will Arnett look for a potential new family car.

- Part of the 2004 "Make Room for Caddy" episode of The Bernie Mac Show was filmed in the Casa de Cadillac showroom.

- In the opening of San Fernando Valley natives HAIM "Want You Back" music video.

References

External links
Official Website
Jeep Grand Cherokee Dealer
Original Photo of Don Lee Cadillac Taken in 1949

Sherman Oaks, Los Angeles
American companies established in 1949
Retail companies established in 1949
Companies based in California
Auto dealerships of the United States
Cadillac
1949 establishments in California
Commercial buildings completed in 1949
Googie architecture in California